CIHC-TV is a community channel in the community of Hay River, Northwest Territories.

External links
 
CIHC-TV history - Canadian Communication Foundation

IHC
Canadian community channels
IHC
Television channels and stations established in 1953